József "Joe" Rudán (born 5 June 1963 in Pécs) is the vocalist of Hungarian heavy metal band Pokolgép since 1990 to 2010. He is also a bass guitarist, but now he doesn't play on bass guitar in any of his current bands.

Bands
1978: Ewerest – bass, vocals
1979: HGM
1981–85: Morris
1983: Signal
1984: Spirál
1986: Jet
1987: Candy
1988: Alfa
1988–present: Coda – vocals
1989: Griff
1990–2010: Pokolgép – vocals
1997–2007: P. Mobil – vocals
2008–2013: Mobilmánia- vocals
2014–present: Dinamit – vocals
2015–present: Rudán Joe Band -vocals

Discography

Pokolgép
1991 – Adj új erőt
1992 – Vedd el, ami jár
1995 – Az utolsó merénylet (on tracks "Győzd le a gonoszt" and "Mindhalálig rock 'n' roll")
1996 – A gép
2000 – Csakazértis
2001 – Ancient Fever
2001 – Live
2002 – Te sem vagy más
2002 – Momentum
2004 – A túlélő
2006 – Oblatio

P. Mobil
1998 – Kutyából szalonna
1999 – Színe-java

MobilMánia
2008 – Ez A Mánia
2010 – Az út legyen veled

External links
 Data at Pokolgép's website

1963 births
Living people
Hungarian bass guitarists
Male bass guitarists
20th-century Hungarian male singers
Heavy metal singers
21st-century Hungarian male singers